Trimer may refer to:

 Trimer (chemistry), a reaction product composed of three identical molecules
 Protein trimer, a compound of three macromolecules non-covalently bound
 Efimov trimer, a weakly bound quantum mechanical state of three identical particles
 Trimer, Ille-et-Vilaine, a commune in France

See also
 Trimery (botany), having three parts in a distinct whorl of a plant structure
 Trimerus, Latin name of the Isole Tremiti, Italy
 tri, a prefix
 -mer, an affix
 Trimmer (disambiguation)